Districts of Switzerland are a political subdivision for cantons. In the federally constituted Switzerland, each canton is completely free to decide its own internal organisation. Therefore, there exists a variety of structures and terminology for the subnational entities between canton and municipality, loosely termed districts. Most cantons are divided into Bezirke (German for districts, singular Bezirk). They are also termed Ämter (Lucerne, singular Amt), Amtsbezirke (Bern, Amtsbezirk), district (in French) or distretto (Ticino and part of Graubünden). The Bezirke generally provide only administration and court organization. However, for historical reasons districts in cantons Graubünden and Schwyz are their own legal entities with jurisdiction over tax and often have their own Landsgemeinde.

Seven of the 26 cantons – Uri, Obwalden, Nidwalden, Glarus, Zug, Basel-City and Geneva – have always existed without the district level of government. An eighth one, Appenzell Innerrhoden, uses no intermediate level either, but calls its lowest-level subdivisions Bezirke, although they are functionally equivalent to municipalities elsewhere.

A further number of cantons are considering (or have already decided) an abolition of the district level in the future. Appenzell Ausserrhoden, Schaffhausen, Lucerne, St. Gallen and Schwyz voted in 2006 on its abolition; some voted in favour of keeping the division, some with modifications. Bern in 2006 decided a reduction of its 26 districts to ten administrative regions, which took effect in 2010. St. Gallen, Solothurn and Lucerne removed the administrative role, but retained districts for elections. In 2008 Vaud decided on a reduction from 19 to 10 districts, followed by Thurgau which combined eight into five in 2012. In 2017 Graubünden replaced the 11 districts with 11 regions. In 2018 Neuchâtel eliminated the district level.

Zürich

The Canton of Zürich is divided into 12 districts (German: Bezirke):
Affoltern with capital Affoltern am Albis
Andelfingen with capital Andelfingen
Bülach with capital Bülach
Dielsdorf with capital Dielsdorf
Dietikon with capital Dietikon
Hinwil with capital Hinwil
Horgen with capital Horgen
Meilen with capital Meilen
Pfäffikon with capital Pfäffikon
Uster with capital Uster
Winterthur with capital Winterthur
Zürich comprises the city of Zürich

Bern

The Canton of Bern is divided in five regions: Berner Jura, Seeland (with two subregions, Biel/Bienne and Seeland), Bern-Mittelland, Oberland (with subregions Thun, Obersimmental-Saanen, Frutigen-Niedersimmental, Interlaken-Oberhasli) and Emmental-Oberaargau (with two subregions, Emmental and Oberaargau)
The current division has taken effect on 1 January 2010, based on a 2006 decision to abolish the former system of districts.

On 1 January 2010, the 26 administrative districts (Amtsbezirke) lost their administrative role that was transferred to 10 new administrative districts (Verwaltungskreise):

Bern-Mittelland with capital Ostermundigen, made up of all or part of the former districts of Bern, Fraubrunnen, Konolfingen, Laupen, Schwarzenburg and Seftigen
Biel/Bienne with capital Biel/Bienne, made up of all of the former district of Biel and about half of the former district of Nidau
Emmental with capital Langnau im Emmental, made up of all or part of the former districts of Burgdorf, Signau and Trachselwald
Frutigen-Niedersimmental with capital Frutigen, made up of all or part of the former districts of Frutigen and Niedersimmental
Interlaken-Oberhasli with capital Interlaken, made up of all or part of the former districts of Interlaken and Oberhasli
Jura bernois with capital Courtelary, made up of all or part of the former districts of Courtelary, Moutier and La Neuveville
Oberaargau with capital Wangen an der Aare, made up of all or part of the former districts of Aarwangen and Wangen
Obersimmental-Saanen with capital Saanen, made up of all of the former districts of Obersimmental and Saanen
Seeland with capital Aarberg, made up of all or part of the former districts of Aarberg, Büren, Erlach and Nidau
Thun with capital Thun, made up of all of the former administrative district of Thun

Nota bene that the 26 Bernese districts do still formally exist and are maintained by Article 38 of the Law on the Organisation of the Executive Council and the Administration (Organization Law, LOCA/OrG).

Lucerne

The Canton of Lucerne used to be divided into 5 Ämter:
Entlebuch with capital Schüpfheim
Hochdorf with capital Hochdorf
Luzern with capital Luzern
Sursee with capital Sursee
Willisau with capital Willisau

These were abolished with the new cantonal constitution of 2007, although they will continue to be used as electoral districts.

Schwyz

The Canton of Schwyz is divided into 6 districts:
 Einsiedeln including only the municipality of the same name
 Gersau including only the municipality of the same name
 Höfe with capital alternating between Wollerau and the village of Pfäffikon
 Küssnacht including only the municipality of the same name
 March with capital Lachen
 Schwyz with capital Schwyz

Fribourg

The Canton of Fribourg is divided into 7 districts:
Broye with capital Estavayer-le-Lac
Glâne with capital Romont
Gruyère with capital Bulle
Sarine with capital Fribourg
See/Lac with capital Murten/Morat
Sense with capital Tafers
Veveyse with capital Châtel-Saint-Denis

Solothurn

From 2005, Solothurn's ten districts are merged pairwise into five electoral districts, termed Amtei. From 2005, districts only have a statistical meaning.
 Bucheggberg, Amtei Wasseramt-Bucheggberg
 Dorneck, Amtei Dorneck-Thierstein (unofficially Schwarzbubenland)
 Gäu, Amtei Thal-Gäu
 Gösgen, Amtei Olten-Gösgen (unofficially Niederamt)
 Lebern, Amtei Solothurn-Lebern
 Olten, Amtei Olten-Gösgen
 Solothurn, Amtei Solothurn-Lebern
 Thal, Amtei Thal-Gäu
 Thierstein, Amtei Dorneck-Thierstein
 Wasseramt, Amtei Wasseramt-Bucheggberg

Basel-Landschaft

Basel-Landschaft is divided into 5 districts:
Arlesheim with capital Arlesheim
Laufen with capital Laufen
Liestal with capital Liestal
Sissach with capital Sissach
Waldenburg with capital Waldenburg

St. Gallen

The canton abolished the district level in 2003, but it remains divided into eight constituencies (Wahlkreise) without administrative significance:
Rheintal with capital Altstätten
Rorschach with capital Rorschach
Sarganserland with capital Sargans
See-Gaster with capital Rapperswil-Jona
St. Gallen with capital St. Gallen
Toggenburg with capital Lichtensteig
Werdenberg with capital Buchs
Wil with capital Wil

Graubünden

Beginning in 2017 Graubünden is divided into 11 regions:
 Albula
 Bernina
 Engiadina Bassa/Val Müstair
 Imboden
 Landquart
 Maloja
 Moesa
 Plessur
 Prättigau/Davos
 Surselva
 Viamala

Aargau

Aargau is divided into 11 districts:
Aarau with capital Aarau
Baden with capital Baden
Bremgarten with capital Bremgarten
Brugg with capital Brugg
Kulm with capital Unterkulm
Laufenburg with capital Laufenburg
Lenzburg with capital Lenzburg
Muri with capital Muri
Rheinfelden with capital Rheinfelden
Zofingen with capital Zofingen
Zurzach with capital Zurzach

Thurgau

Thurgau is divided into five districts (eight prior to 2011) and each is named after its capital:

Arbon with capital Arbon
Frauenfeld with capital Frauenfeld
Kreuzlingen with capital Kreuzlingen
Münchwilen with capital Münchwilen
Weinfelden with capital Weinfelden

Ticino

Ticino is divided into 8 districts:
 Bellinzona with capital Bellinzona
 Blenio with capital Acquarossa
 Leventina with capital Faido
 Locarno with capital Locarno
 Lugano with capital Lugano
 Mendrisio with capital Mendrisio
 Riviera with capital Riviera
 Vallemaggia with capital Cevio

Vaud

Vaud is divided into 10 districts:
Aigle with capital Aigle
Broye-Vully with capital Payerne
Gros-de-Vaud with capital Echallens
Jura-North Vaudois with capital Yverdon-les-Bains
Lausanne with capital Lausanne
Lavaux-Oron with capital Cully
Morges with capital Morges
Nyon with capital Nyon
Riviera-Pays-d'Enhaut with capital Vevey
Ouest Lausannois with capital Renens

Valais

Valais is divided into 13 districts:
 Brig with capital Brig-Glis
 Conthey with capital Conthey
 Entremont with capital Sembrancher
 Goms with capital Münster-Geschinen
 Hérens with capital Evolène
 Leuk with capital Leuk
 Martigny with capital Martigny
 Monthey with capital Monthey
 Saint-Maurice with capital Saint-Maurice
 Sierre with capital Sierre
 Sion with capital Sion
 Visp with capital Visp

The district of Raron is divided into:
 Östlich Raron with capital Mörel-Filet
 Westlich Raron with capital Raron

Neuchâtel

The Canton of Neuchâtel was divided into 6 districts until 1 January 2018 when the district system was terminated.
Boudry with capital Boudry
La Chaux-de-Fonds with capital La Chaux-de-Fonds
Le Locle with capital Le Locle
Neuchâtel with capital Neuchâtel
Val-de-Ruz with capital Cernier
Val-de-Travers with capital Val-de-Travers

Jura

The Canton of Jura is divided into 3 districts:
Delémont with capital Delémont
Porrentruy with capital Porrentruy
Franches-Montagnes with capital Saignelégier

Schaffhausen

The Canton of Schaffhausen is divided into 6 districts:
Stein with capital Stein am Rhein
Schaffhausen with capital Schaffhausen
Schleitheim with capital Schleitheim
Oberklettgau with capital Neunkirch
Unterklettgau with capital Hallau
Reiat with capital Thayngen

Appenzell Ausserrhoden

The Canton of Appenzell Ausserrhoden is divided into 3 districts:
Hinterland with capital Herisau
Mittelland with capital Trogen
Vorderland with capital Heiden

Appenzell Innerrhoden

In Appenzell Innerrhoden districts are the lowest administrative division as the canton has no municipalities (except for the Feuerschaugemeinde, a special-purpose municipality for the town of Appenzell). The districts are functionally equivalent to municipalities elsewhere in Switzerland, and are generally shown as municipalities on maps etc.

The Canton is divided into 5 districts:
Appenzell with capital Appenzell
Gonten 
Oberegg
Schlatt-Haslen
Schwende-Rüte with capital Appenzell

See also
Municipalities of Switzerland

Notes and references

 
Subdivisions of Switzerland
Districts
Switzerland 2
Districts, Switzerland